Kitchener City Council is the governing body for the city of Kitchener, Ontario, Canada.

The council consists of the Mayor of Kitchener and 10 ward councillors.

2006-2010
Council elected in the 2006 municipal election.

2010-2014
Council elected in the 2010 municipal election.

2014-2018
Council elected in the 2014 municipal election.

2018-2022
Council elected in the 2018 municipal election.

2022-2026
Council elected in the 2022 municipal election.

References

Municipal councils in Ontario
Municipal government of Kitchener, Ontario
Politics of Kitchener, Ontario